Anders Skaarseth (born 7 May 1995 in Lillehammer) is a Norwegian cyclist, who currently rides for UCI ProTeam .

His brother Iver is also a professional cyclist on the same team.

Major results

2015
 3rd Road race, National Under-23 Road Championships
 5th Road race, National Road Championships
 7th Ronde van Vlaanderen Beloften
 10th Overall Course de la Paix U23
2016
 1st Stage 1 (TTT) ZLM Tour
 2nd Ghent–Wevelgem U23
 4th Road race, National Under-23 Road Championships
 8th Overall Tour de Bretagne
2017
 1st  Road race, National Under-23 Road Championships
 2nd Overall Tour de Bretagne
1st  Points classification
1st  Young rider classification
 2nd Grote Prijs Marcel Kint
 5th Ronde van Vlaanderen Beloften
 8th Ringerike GP
 9th Paris–Troyes
 10th Road race, UCI Under-23 Road World Championships
2018
 4th Omloop Het Nieuwsblad Beloften
 5th Lillehammer GP
 6th Overall International Tour of Rhodes
 8th Himmerland Rundt
 8th Skive–Løbet
 10th International Rhodes Grand Prix
2019
 5th Road race, National Road Championships
 6th Overall Oberösterreich Rundfahrt
1st  Points classification
1st Stage 3
 6th Overall Tour of Norway
 8th Skive–Løbet
 9th Lillehammer GP
 10th International Rhodes Grand Prix
2021
 2nd Road race, National Road Championships

References

External links

1995 births
Living people
Norwegian male cyclists
Sportspeople from Lillehammer